Parish Hill High School is a regional secondary school and middle school in rural Chaplin, Connecticut.

General information
Parish Hill Middle/High School teaches grades 7 to 12 to students from three local towns: Chaplin, Hampton and Scotland. The school is nicknamed the Hill, and the school mascot is the "Pirate." Parish Hill is Regional District #11.

Demographics
Racial makeup of the school in 2006-2007 was 
White 92%, 
African American 1.2%, 
Native American 0.9%, 
Asian 0.6% 
Hispanic or Latino of any race were 3.1% of the population.

After-school activities
Parish Hill offers many after-school activities, including Diversity Club, middle and high school drama clubs, five competing vocal choirs, various instrumental ensembles, and middle and high school newspaper clubs. The school also recently underwent a reconstruction to its video program which now houses state of the art video production equipment and broadcasts news to the school and to the surrounding three towns on Channel 17.

The school offers baseball, softball, basketball, and soccer for middle school and high school students, golf, track & field, cross country and happy hands for high school students.

Attempt to dissolve school district
In previous years, due to poor test scores and high per pupil costs, the three participating towns of Scotland, Chaplin, and Hampton explored the options of withdrawing from, dissolving, or re-envisioning the high school.

There have been several attempts by the three towns (Hampton, Scotland, and Chaplin) to dissolve Regional District #11, in which all three towns must vote yes to dissolve. On November 12, 2009, the most recent referendum was narrowly defeated, where Hampton and Scotland voted to dissolve, and Chaplin voted to not.

Parish Hill underwent an evaluation by a NEASC (New England Association of Schools and Colleges) visiting team and is a fully credited school. The NEASC put Parish Hill on probation in 2006, due to overcrowding and low test scores. However, in the 2010 to 2011 school year, Parish Hill student test scores showed a marked increase. The school is getting ready for the NEASC's decennial inspection in October and November 2016.

References

External links 
 

Schools in Windham County, Connecticut
Public high schools in Connecticut
Chaplin, Connecticut
Libraries in Windham County, Connecticut